"What You Need" is a song by American singer Don Toliver. It was released by Cactus Jack Records, Atlantic Records, and We Run It Entertainment on May 4, 2021, as the lead single from Toliver's second album Life of a Don.

Background
A snippet of the song was teased on social media in April 2021. The song leaked on to the internet a few hours before its official release on May 4, 2021, after it was accidentally released on Apple Music by his label.

Music video
The music video was also released on YouTube on May 4, 2021. Kali Uchis makes a cameo appearance in the beginning of the video.

Charts

Certifications

References

2021 singles
Atlantic Records singles
Don Toliver songs
Songs written by Don Toliver
Songs written by Dustin Corbett
Songs written by Hit-Boy
Song recordings produced by Hit-Boy
Song recordings produced by Sir Dylan